Rita Wilden, née Jahn (born 9 October 1947 in Leipzig) is a German athlete, who competed mainly in the 400 metres.

She competed for West Germany in the 1972 Summer Olympics held in Munich in the 400 metres where she won the silver medal.  Later on in the same Games she helped her teammates Anette Rückes, Inge Bödding and Hildegard Falck to a bronze in the first Olympic women's 4 x 400 m relay.  Previously as Rita Jahn she had competed in the 200 metres and on the West German 4 x 100 m relay team at the 1968 Olympics, the team finishing 6th.  1976 was her third and last Olympics, making the semi-final round in the 400, and her team finishing 5th in the 4x400.

She achieved a silver medal on the West German 4x100 metres relay team at the 1969 European Championships and a bronze medal at the 1974 European Championships.

References

External links
 Sporting Heroes - Biography

1947 births
Living people
West German female sprinters
Athletes (track and field) at the 1968 Summer Olympics
Athletes (track and field) at the 1972 Summer Olympics
Athletes (track and field) at the 1976 Summer Olympics
Olympic athletes of West Germany
Olympic silver medalists for West Germany
Olympic bronze medalists for West Germany
Athletes from Leipzig
European Athletics Championships medalists
Medalists at the 1972 Summer Olympics
Olympic silver medalists in athletics (track and field)
Olympic bronze medalists in athletics (track and field)
Olympic female sprinters